2β-Propanoyl-3β-(2-naphthyl)-tropane or WF-23 (Wake Forest-23, named after the university where it was first created) is a cocaine analogue. It is several hundred times more potent than cocaine at being a serotonin-norepinephrine-dopamine reuptake inhibitor.

As can be seen on PubMed, these acyl substituted phenyltropanes are highly potent MAT inhibitors and also have a very long half-life, spanning perhaps at least a few days; as the half-life of the dopamine transporter in rats was found to be 2-3 days under normal conditions (with agonists, antagonists, and transporter inhibitors altering the half-life), it may be that WF-23 largely or mostly binds to its transporters until they are degraded.

See also 
 HDEP-28
 HDMP-28
 List of cocaine analogues

External links 
 (Satendra Singh, 2000) Page 16-17

References 

Tropanes
Serotonin–norepinephrine–dopamine reuptake inhibitors
Stimulants
2-Naphthyl compounds
Ketones